Mavrovë is a village in the Vlorë County, Albania, about  southeast of Vlorë, in the Shushicë River valley. At the 2015 local government reform, it became part of the municipality Selenicë.

Notable people
Kadri Hazbiu, Communist figure, Sigurimi Chief,  Minister of Defence, and Minister of Interior

References

External links
 http://www.maplandia.com/albania/vlore/mavrove/
 http://nona.net/features/map/placedetail.870451/Shkall%C3%AB%20Mavrov%C3%AB/

Populated places in Selenicë
Villages in Vlorë County